Katerina Johnovna Keyru (later Novoseltseva, ; born 4 December 1988) is a Russian basketball shooting guard. She was part of the Russian team that won the 2008 European junior championships.

Keyru was born to John Carew, an Olympic sprint runner from Sierra Leone, who in 1976 came to study in Rostov and married there. She has three brothers: Olah, Willy and Victor. Olah is an actor, Willy is a singer, and Victor is an international basketball player. Katerina took up basketball aged 7 following her brothers. In 2015, she married the Russian football player Ivan Novoseltsev, who proposed her after an official football match, in front of the crowd.

References

1988 births
Sportspeople from Rostov-on-Don
Living people
Russian women's basketball players
Russian people of Sierra Leonean descent
Shooting guards
21st-century Russian women